The list of shipwrecks in 1795 includes ships sunk, foundered, wrecked, grounded or otherwise lost during 1795.

January

2 January

5 January

6 January

21 January

23 January

26 January

29 January

30 January

Unknown date

February

4 February

24 February

Unknown date

March

7 March

Unknown date

April

4 April

13 April

24 April

Unknown date

May

1 May

Unknown date

June

5 June

15 June

18 June

19 June

20 June

Unknown date

July

13 July

Unknown date

August

2 August

11 August

24 August

Unknown date

September

2 September

5 September

6 September

9 September

27 September

29 September

Unknown date

October

2 October

4 October

11 October

15 October

19 October

20 October

23 October

24 October

27 October

30 October

Unknown date

November

2 November

3 November

6 November

8 November

11 November

18 November

21 November

22 November

Unknown date

December

10 December

12 December

14 December

19 December

22 December

29 December

Unknown date

Unknown date

References

1795